Qoros Auto Co., Ltd. was a Chinese automotive manufacturing company headquartered in Shanghai, China. Its principal activity was the design, development, production and sale of passenger cars sold under the Qoros marque.

It was founded as a joint venture between Chery and Israel Corporation in December 2007 under the name Chery Quantum Automotive Corporation (CQAC). The name was changed to Qoros Auto Co., Ltd. in November 2011.  In December 2017 Baoneng Group, secured a 51 percent stake in Qoros for 6.6 billion RMB.

The first production model, the Qoros 3, made its first public appearance at the Geneva Motor Show in March 2013 and went on sale in China in November 2013.

Name
Qoros is an invented word. The Q is intended to represent quality, and the whole name to echo the Greek chorus, a collective voice in plays and music, reflecting the multinational nature of the company.

History
It was founded as a joint venture between Chery and Israel Corporation in December 2007 under the name Chery Quantum Automotive Corporation (CQAC); the name was changed to Qoros Auto Co., Ltd. in November 2011. Qoros was established as a 50-50 joint venture between Chery and Kenon's subsidiary Quantum. Kenon later took over Quantum's stake, making the current partners Chery and Kenon Holdings, which controls Israel Corp's investment.  The establishment of the company took place during a peak time in the development of China's automotive industry, following the country's joining the World Trade Organization and amid a phase of rapid growth in vehicle production and sales.

Qoros opened an office in Shanghai in September 2008.

In October 2009, Qoros signed a cooperation agreement with Magna Steyr.
 
In June 2010, Qoros relocated its production plant to Changshu Economic & Technological Development Zone following an in-depth appraisal.

In October 2011, construction of the first prototype was completed. A formal unveiling ceremony was held at Changshu, Jiangsu Province, China.

In 2017, Qoros announced a hiatus to retail Qoros vehicles throughout Europe. However, they are looking into South America as a promising market.

As of early 2018, private Chinese conglomerate Baoneng Investment Group had acquired a 51 percent stake in Qoros, leaving Singaporean investment company Kenon Holdings with a 24 percent stake and Chery with a 25 percent stake. Later in January 2019, Kenon Holdings transferred the 12 percent stake of its 24 percent stake in Qoros to Baoneng Investment Group for RMB 1.56 billion yuan ($230 million). Baoneng owns 63 percent of Qoros, Kenon Holdings owns 12 percent of Qoros, and Chery Automobile continues to own 25 percent after the deal.

As of January 2020, Baoneng Investment Group purchased PSA’s assembly plant operated by Changan PSA in Shenzhen, a southern Chinese city where PSA builds DS models. Changan PSA is a 50-50 joint venture between PSA Group and Chinese automaker Changan Automobile. Changan sold its 50-percent share in the joint venture with PSA to Baoneng for 1.63 billion yuan ($234 million).

By September 2020, Qoros 7, the first model of Qoros under Baoneng Investment Group's control was launched. The model is also the flagship model of Qoros, as it is the largest model offered by Qoros up to date.

As of 2022, it was reported that Baoneng had ended production of Qoros models, and had begun auctioning off production equipment.

Sales

2014 
Sales in China commenced in December 2013, and by the first four months of 2014 the company had sold 1,490 Qoros 3 cars. The sedan is to be joined by a hatchback version in July 2014. By August 2014, Qoros had sold 2,540 cars. Qoros is not expected to make a profit in the early years, "as is usual for beginning companies."

The total sales for 2014, the company's first year of operation, was under 7,000 cars, far below its planned capacity for 150,000 cars. This led to a change in senior management, including the chairman Guo Qian replaced by Chery deputy president and Jaguar Land Rover board chairman Chen Anning. In February 2015, the company announced a new CEO, former General Motors' executive Phil Murtaugh. Murtaugh left the company after less than a year.

2015 
Over 2015, Qoros sold 14,000 cars.

2016 
In 2016, sales of Qoros cars increased by 70 percent, totalling 24,188 for the year.

The company had planned to sell models in Europe, and piloted sales in Slovakia, but in April 2017 it formally announced that it had no plans to sell cars in Europe for the foreseeable future.

Models

Qoros 3

In December 2011, the company released an image of its first prototype, which made its first public appearance at the Geneva Motor Show in March 2013 with the Qoros 3 sedan pre-production model, together with the Qoros 3 Estate Concept and Qoros 3 Cross Hybrid Concept.

In September 2013, the Qoros 3 achieved a five-star rating in the Euro NCAP crash tests, making it the first ever Chinese car to achieve such a rating. It also received the highest score for safety of any car reviewed by Euro NCAP during 2013.

In November 2015, the Qoros 5 was launched at the Guangzhou motor show in China, with sales commencing in March 2016.

Qoros 5

The Qoros 5 is the second model of automobile from the Chinese manufacturer Qoros Auto, jointly (50%–50%) owned by Kenon Holdings and China's Chery Automobile Company at the time.

The five-door CUV was launched at the Guangzhou Motor Show in November 2015.  Sales commenced in China early March 2016.

Qoros Young

The Qoros Young is a compact crossover from the Chinese manufacturer Qoros Auto, after the holdings of Qoros was jointly (50%–50%) owned by Kenon Holdings and China's Chery Automobile Company, the Qoros Young was revealed as a rebadged version of the Chery Tiggo 7.

Qoros 7

The Qoros 7 is the third original model of automobile from the Chinese manufacturer Qoros Auto, under the control of Baoneng Investment Group at the time.

Product Gallery

Concept models

eBIQE
At the 2014 Geneva Motor Show, Qoros displayed a concept electric bicycle called the eBIQE.

Qoros 2 Concept
The Qoros 2 was first displayed at the 2015 Geneva Motor Show as a concept plug-in hybrid SUV.

Qoros Mile 1 Concept
At the 2018 Beijing Auto Show, Qoros displayed a concept GT called the Qoros Mile 1 Concept.

Qoros Mile II Concept
At the 2019 Shanghai Auto Show, Qoros displayed a concept shootingbrake called the Qoros Mile II Concept.

Qoros Milestone Concept
At the 2020 Beijing Auto Show, Qoros displayed a concept sedan called the Qoros Milestone Concept.

References

External links
 Company website

Car manufacturers of China
Electric vehicle manufacturers of China
Chinese companies established in 2007
Vehicle manufacturing companies established in 2007
Manufacturing companies based in Shanghai
Chery
Chinese-foreign joint-venture companies
Motor vehicle manufacturers of Israel
Pudong